Blakstad Station is a railway station in the village of Blakstad on the east side of the river Nidelva in the municipality of Froland in Agder county, Norway. Located along the Arendalsbanen railway line, it is served by the Go-Ahead Norge. 

References

Railway stations in Agder
Railway stations on the Arendal Line
Railway stations opened in 1989
1989 establishments in Norway
Froland